The 2007–08 NJIT Highlanders men's basketball team represented the New Jersey Institute of Technology and the NJIT Highlanders men's basketball program in the 2007–08 college basketball season. They are the first team to ever go 0–29. The closest they came to a win all year were two nine-point losses, 62–53 to Stony Brook and 67–58 to Lehigh. Head coach Jim Casciano and the entire team of men's basketball coaching staff stepped down after the season.

Games played

Source: https://web.archive.org/web/20141228173753/http://njithighlanders.cstv.com/sports/m-baskbl/archive/njit-m-baskbl-sched-2007.html

External links
https://sports.yahoo.com/ncaab/teams/ncf

Njit
NJIT Highlanders men's basketball seasons